Tulucești is a commune in Galați County, Western Moldavia, Romania with a population of 7,444 people. It is composed of three villages: Șivița, Tătarca and Tulucești.

Part of the Lunca Joasă a Prutului Inferior Natural Park is situated on the territory of Tulucești. The Șivița oil field is also situated within the commune.

References

Communes in Galați County
Localities in Western Moldavia
Populated places on the Prut